Vasyl Ivanovich Hamianin (born 25 December 1971) is a Ukrainian career diplomat, translator and sinologist. He has served as Ukrainian Ambassador to Indonesia since October 2021.

Early life and education 
Hamianin was born on 25 December 1971 in Dnipro, then part of the Ukrainian Soviet Socialist Republic of the Soviet Union. He studied foreign philology at the Kyiv State University (today Taras Shevchenko National University of Kyiv), graduating in 1995. He continued his education at the National Academy of Sciences of Ukraine, graduating in 2000 with a PhD thesis titled "Transformation processes in the history of modern China (1911-1949)".

Career 
After graduating from Kyiv State University, Hamianin worked several jobs including as a translator, public relations manager, an auditor, and a human resource manager. He began working at the National Academy of Sciences in 1999 and moved to the Ukrainian Ministry of Foreign Affairs in 2002. There, he was appointed third secretary within the directorate of Asia Pacific affairs, before he was assigned to the Ukrainian Embassy in Beijing until 2007 as a secretary.

Hamianin returned to Ukraine to work as a consultant for the Ukrainian parliament in October 2007. He returned to the Foreign Affairs Ministry in November 2010, becoming the head of its Far Eastern department. On 3 August 2011, Hamianin was appointed radnik-poslannik (deputy ambassador) at the Ukrainian Embassy in Beijing. After ambassador Yurii Kostenko was recalled on 12 September 2012, Hamianin was appointed as chargé d'affaires and held this post until 1 September 2013 when a permanent ambassador took office. He returned once more to parliamentary consultancy in 2017, advising the Rada's speaker on foreign affairs until 2019 when he once more returned to the Foreign Affairs ministry. At the ministry, he was promoted as deputy director of the 4th regional department, covering Central Asia, South Asia, East Asia, Southeast Asia, Australia, and Oceania.

Ambassador to Indonesia 
On 30 July 2021, President Volodymyr Zelenskyy appointed Hamianin as Ukrainian Ambassador to Indonesia, replacing Volodymyr Pakhil who had been removed in 2020. Hamianin presented his credentials to President of Indonesia Joko Widodo on 25 October 2021. In mid-December 2021, Hamianin visited the Ukrainian community in Bali to introduce himself.

Shortly following the Russian invasion on 24 February, Hamianin appeared on virtual press conferences and on Indonesian media outlets, calling for Indonesia to condemn Russian actions. He also called for the Indonesian Islamic community to condemn the war, including with a visit to Nahdlatul Ulama chairman Yahya Cholil Staquf. In August 2022, he was warned by the Indonesian Ministry of Foreign Affairs for his tweet criticizing Indonesia's position of condemning Israeli attacks in Gaza while not condemning the Russian invasion.

Several days prior to the 2022 G20 Bali summit, on 10 November 2022 the Minister of Foreign Affairs Dmytro Kuleba signed the Treaty of Amity and Cooperation in Southeast Asia. Upon the signing of the treaty, President Zelenskyy appointed Hamianin as the temporary representative of Ukraine to the ASEAN. Hamianin presented his credentials to the Secretary General of ASEAN, Kao Kim Hourn, on 13 March 2023.

Personal life 
Hamianin is married with two sons and a daughter. After the Russian invasion, his daughter Varvara Hamianin was evacuated to Indonesia along with Indonesian citizens in Ukraine.

References 

1971 births
Living people
Ambassadors of Ukraine to Indonesia
People from Dnipro
Ukrainian translators
Taras Shevchenko National University of Kyiv alumni